The EEG DIN connector (also referred to as DIN 42802 or EEG safety DIN connector) is an electrical connector used to connect medical and biomedical recording systems, such as electrodes to electroencephalograph (EEG) as used in neurology. This type of connector is the de facto standard for electrochemical instruments as it was adopted by the industry under pressure from regulatory bodies (including the FDA) to impose insulated connectors in clinical settings for safety reasons through the IEC 60601-1 (subclause 56.3(c)) norm.

In 1989, the Deutsches Institut für Normung has issued the 42802 standard, which specified a "touch-proof connector for electromedical application".

The EEG DIN connector mainly exists in two types, both featuring touch-proof sockets around in-line rigid plugs :
 The DIN 42802-1 connector with a 1.5 mm diameter pin
 And the E-DIN 42802-2 with a 2 mm diameter pin.

References

External links 
 When is a standard not really a standard? – By Bob Frank, Affinity Medical Technologies [archived]

Electrical signal connectors